Melchor "Mel" Menor is an American Muay Thai kickboxer. Menor has also won the WKA Super Elite Class World Champion 1994–1997, WMTF Jr WelterWeight Muay Thai Champion 1997 and the K-U Super Elite Class World Champion 1999. Menor has also appeared on television shows such as Fight Science and Stan Lee's Superhumans including the film Here Comes the Boom.

Fight record

|- style="background:#fbb;"
|2002-10-11
| style="text-align:center;"|Loss
|align=left| Takehiro Murahama
|K-1 World MAX 2002 USA
|Tokyo, Japan
| style="text-align:center;"|Decision (Unanimous)
|align=center|3
|align=center|

|- style="background:#cfc;"
|2002-05-03
| style="text-align:center;"|Win
|align=left| Danny Steele
|K-1 World Grand Prix 2002 Preliminary USA
|Las Vegas, Nevada
| style="text-align:center;"|Decision (Unanimous)
|align=center|5
|align=center|

|-
|- style="background:#cfc;"
|2001-08-11
| style="text-align:center;"|Win
|align=left| William Syrapai
|K-1 World Grand Prix 2001
|Las Vegas, Nevada
| style="text-align:center;"|Decision (Unanimous)
|align=center|5
|align=center|

|- bgcolor="#fbb"
| 2001-06-03 || Loss||align=left| Robert Kaennorasing || Warriors Cup 3 || Burbank, California, USA || Decision (Unanimous) ||3 || 3:00

|- style="background:#fbb;"
|2000-09-09
| style="text-align:center;"|Loss
|align=left| Jaroenthong Kiatbanchong
|Warriors Cup of America
|Irvine, California, United States
| style="text-align:center;"|Decision (Unanimous)
|align=center|5
|align=center|3:00

|-  bgcolor="#fbb"
| 2000-05-26 || Loss||align=left| Masato || Colosseum 2000 || Japan || TKO (Referee Stoppage) || 4 || 2:59

|-
|- style="background:#cfc;"
| 1997-07-
| Win
|align=left| Nicholas Read 
| WORLD CHAMPIONSHIP A MATTER OF PRIDE 3
| Los Angeles, CA    
| Decision
| 5
|
|-

|- style="background:#cfc;"
|1996-10-11
| style="text-align:center;"|Win
|align=left| Danny Steele
|Super Brawl II
|Honolulu, Hawaii
| style="text-align:center;"|TKO (Doctor stoppage)
|align=center|5
|align=center|

|-
| colspan=9 | Legend:

References

1974 births
Living people
American martial artists of Filipino descent
Kickboxing trainers
Kickboxers from California
American male kickboxers
American Muay Thai practitioners
Filipino Muay Thai practitioners
Welterweight kickboxers
Muay Thai trainers